This is a list of mathematical topics in quantum theory, by Wikipedia page. See also list of functional analysis topics, list of Lie group topics, list of quantum-mechanical systems with analytical solutions.

Mathematical formulation of quantum mechanics

 bra–ket notation
 canonical commutation relation
 complete set of commuting observables
 Heisenberg picture
 Hilbert space
 Interaction picture
 Measurement in quantum mechanics
 quantum field theory
 quantum logic
 quantum operation
 Schrödinger picture
 semiclassical
 statistical ensemble
 wavefunction
 wave–particle duality
 Wightman axioms
 WKB approximation

Schrödinger equation

 quantum mechanics, matrix mechanics, Hamiltonian (quantum mechanics)
 particle in a box
 particle in a ring
 particle in a spherically symmetric potential
 quantum harmonic oscillator
 hydrogen atom
 ring wave guide
 particle in a one-dimensional lattice (periodic potential)
 Fock symmetry in theory of hydrogen

Symmetry

 identical particles
 angular momentum
 angular momentum operator
 rotational invariance
 rotational symmetry
rotation operator
 translational symmetry
 Lorentz symmetry
 Parity transformation
 Noether's theorem
 Noether charge
 spin (physics)
 isospin
 Aman matrices
 scale invariance
 spontaneous symmetry breaking
 supersymmetry breaking

Quantum states

 quantum number
 Pauli exclusion principle
 quantum indeterminacy
 uncertainty principle
 wavefunction collapse
 zero-point energy
 bound state
 coherent state
 squeezed coherent state
 density state
 Fock state, Fock space
 vacuum state
 quasinormal mode
 no-cloning theorem
 quantum entanglement

Dirac equation

 spinor, spinor group, spinor bundle
 Dirac sea
 Spin foam
 Poincaré group
 gamma matrices
 Dirac adjoint
 Wigner's classification
 anyon

Interpretations of quantum mechanics

 Copenhagen interpretation
 locality principle
 Bell's theorem
Bell test loopholes
 CHSH inequality
 hidden variable theory
 path integral formulation, quantum action
 Bohm interpretation
 many-worlds interpretation
 Tsirelson's bound

Quantum field theory

 Feynman diagram
One-loop Feynman diagram
 Schwinger's quantum action principle
 Propagator
 Annihilation operator
 S-matrix
 Standard Model
 Local quantum physics
 Nonlocal
 Effective field theory
 Correlation function (quantum field theory)
 Renormalizable
 Cutoff
 Infrared divergence, infrared fixed point
 Ultraviolet divergence
 Fermi's interaction
 Path-ordering
 Landau pole
 Higgs mechanism
 Wilson line
 Wilson loop
 Tadpole (physics)
 Lattice gauge theory
 BRST charge
 Anomaly (physics)
 Chiral anomaly
 Braid statistics
 Plekton

Computation

 quantum computing
 qubit
 qutrit
 pure qubit state
 quantum dot
 Kane quantum computer
 quantum cryptography
 quantum decoherence
 quantum circuit
 universal quantum computer
 measurement based Quantum Computing
 timeline of quantum computing

Supersymmetry

 Lie superalgebra
 supergroup (physics)
 supercharge
 supermultiplet
 supergravity

Quantum gravity

 theory of everything
 loop quantum gravity
 spin network
 black hole thermodynamics

Non-commutative geometry

 Quantum group
 Hopf algebra
 Noncommutative quantum field theory

String theory
See list of string theory topics

 Matrix model

Quantum theory
 
Mathematics